Ted Clayton (6 January 1911 – 20 December 1994) was a South African cyclist. He competed in the three events at the 1936 Summer Olympics.

References

External links
 

1911 births
1994 deaths
South African male cyclists
Commonwealth Games silver medallists for South Africa
Commonwealth Games bronze medallists for South Africa
Cyclists at the 1934 British Empire Games
Olympic cyclists of South Africa
Cyclists at the 1936 Summer Olympics
People from Paddington
Cyclists from Greater London
English emigrants to South Africa
Commonwealth Games medallists in cycling
20th-century South African people
Medallists at the 1934 British Empire Games